"Mi Verdad" is a song by Mexican band Maná featuring Colombian singer-songwriter Shakira. It was released on 9 February 2015 by the Mexican division of Warner Music Group, as the lead single from Maná's ninth studio album Cama Incendiada.

The song is the main theme of the Mexican telenovela Sueño de amor.

Track listing
Digital download
 "Mi Verdad (feat. Shakira)" -

Charts

Weekly charts

Year-end charts

Certifications

See also
List of number-one Billboard Hot Latin Songs of 2015

References

2015 songs
2015 singles
2010s ballads
Maná songs
Shakira songs
Spanish-language songs
Pop ballads
Warner Music Mexico singles
Songs written by George Noriega
Songs written by Fher Olvera
Telenovela theme songs